Haaniinae is a subfamily of mantises, now placed in the new (2019) family Haaniidae; the species can be found in Asia.

Tribes and genera
The Mantodea Species File lists two tribes:
 tribe Arriini
 Arria Stal, 1877
 Sinomiopteryx Tinkham, 1937
 tribe Haaniini
 Astape Stal, 1877 
 Haania Saussure, 1871

References

Further reading

 

 

Thespidae
Mantodea subfamilies